"Serenade of the Bells" is a popular song written by Kay Twomey, Al Goodhart, and Al Urbano and published in 1947.

The recording by the Sammy Kaye Orchestra was released by RCA Victor as catalog number 20-2372. It first reached the Billboard magazine Best Seller chart on November 7, 1947 and lasted 16 weeks on the chart, peaking at #3.

It first reached the Billboard magazine Best Seller chart on December 12, 1947 and lasted 9 weeks on the chart, peaking at #6. This cover version by Gracie Fields with Phil Green and his orchestra was issued as a 78 rpm single on Decca.

Another version was recorded by Jo Stafford and released by Capitol Records ECJ-500064 1950 ~53 as catalog number 15007.

The recording by the Kay Kyser Orchestra was released on Columbia 37956. It reached the Billboard magazine Best Seller chart on December 26, 1947 at #13, its only week on the chart.

Other recorded versions
Gene Autry
Don Cornell
Vic Damone
The Fleetwoods
Dick Haymes
David Houston
Carl Mann
Gene Pitney
Frank Sinatra
Jo Stafford
The Vibrations
Bobby Vinton
Billy Vaughn
Antonio Machin

References

1947 songs
Songs with lyrics by Kay Twomey
Songs written by Al Goodhart
Jo Stafford songs
Gene Autry songs
Vic Damone songs
The Fleetwoods songs
David Houston (singer) songs
Gene Pitney songs
Frank Sinatra songs
Bobby Vinton songs
RCA Records singles
Decca Records singles
Capitol Records singles
Columbia Records singles